Delavalia polluta is a species of copepod in the family Miraciidae, first described in 1928 by .

References

Harpacticoida
Taxa named by Albert Monard
Crustaceans described in 1928